Araichimani or Manuneethi Chozhan is a 1942 Indian Tamil language film directed by P. K. Raja Sandow. The film stars P. B. Rangachari, M. R. Santhanalakshmi, S. Balachander, S. Varalakshmi, A.R. Sakunthala, N. S. Krishnan and T. A. Mathuram.

Premise
Manuneethi Chozhan was a popular and just king. When a calf is killed by his only son, the mother cow asks for justice. The king orders that his son be killed in the same manner as the calf. The gods come and restore both his son's and the calf's life. This story is downplayed in the film. The film details the aftermath of this popular story.

The prince falls in love with the daughter of a minister in the king's court, but the minister opposes their marriage. Aaraichimani is the story how the two are eventually married.

Cast
Cast according to the song book

Male Cast
 P. B. Rangachariar as Manuchozhan 
 S. Balachandran as Vitangan
 Master Radha as Young Vitagan
 C. P. Viswanathan as Prime Minister 
 B. P. Ramalingam as Second Minister 
 T. S. Ponnusami Pillai as Rajaguru 
 M. R. Swaminathan as Male Scholar
 T. R. Lakshminarayanan as Manoharan
 S. Kosalaram as Katamban
 R. G. Natarajasundaram as Sadhu
 N. S. Krishnan as Sadayan

Female Cast
 M. R. Santhanalakshmi as Thiribuvanai
 S. Varalakshmi as Kalavalli
 A. R. Sakunthala as Lalitha
 P. S. Chandra as Neela
 M. S. Dhanalakshmi as Kanchana
 R. A. Lakshmirani as Mallika
 T. A. Mathuram as Maruthayi
Dance
 Kalamandala Madhavan, Thangamani, Chitralekha, Dance Group

Production
The film was produced by Kandhan Studio, owned by Kandhan and Company in Coimbatore. This film was one of their famed productions. The studio and the company no longer exists now. The laboratory was handled by R. Krishnan. Art direction was by B. D. Kotval and T. R. Ganesan. The settings were by P. B. Krishnan and M. V. Gochap. Finally, the makeup was handled by T. S. Gopal Rao.

Soundtrack
Music was directed by Srinivasa Rao Shinde, in the meantime, the lyrics were written by Kambadasan. The songs were recorded by M. D. Rajaram. Singers include S. Balachander, S. Varalakshmi, N. S. Krishnan, T. A. Mathuram,  P. B. Rangachariar, R. G. Natarajasundaram, T. S. Ponnusami Pillai, Master Radha, S. Kosalaram and A. R. Sakunthala.

References

1942 films
1940s Tamil-language films